The Pagagnotti Triptych is an oil-on-wood triptych by Hans Memling produced circa 1480. The original was disassembled and separated, with the center panel held at the Uffizi gallery in Florence and the two wing panels at the National Gallery in London.

The center (Virgin and Child with two angels) features an enthroned Virgin holding the Child flanked by angels; the left wing shows St. John with a lamb and the right St. Lawrence holding a book. Virgin and saints are positioned within an area enclosed with archways and columns; a landscape and buildings are visible through the rear openings.  A highly unusual night scene showing nine cranes standing beneath a coat of arms is painted on the reverse of the side panels.

The festoons and putti above the Madonna are elements specific to Italian art of the period but not to Early Netherlandish art, suggesting Memling undertook the commission for an Italian donor, most likely Bishop Benedetto Pagagnotti. The art historian Paula Nuttall describes the triptych as "a tour de force, pictorially, technically, and conceptually." Memling combined pictorial traditions and influences from Jan van Eyck and Rogier van der Weyden to evoke the sculptural representations with Italian all'antica influences and motifs. Elements from the painting, especially its background, were copied by Florentine artists such as Fra Filippino Lippi and Fra Bartolomeo. A similar triptych exists, executed by the Master of the Legend of St Ursula.

Background and commission

In the 15th century, Early Netherlandish art was highly sought after by collectors in Italy. Strong commercial ties existed between Bruges and Italy. The city had a branch of the Medici Bank, a large contingent of southern merchants, and paintings and various other art works were steadily exported south to Italy. A substantial amount of northern art was bought by the Medici court for their palaces, which heightened its allure. While stationed in Bruges, Medici banker Tommaso Portinari commissioned the Portinari Altarpiece from Hugo van der Goes and had it transported to Florence for installation.

Memling attracted a large share of clients among the Italian bankers and merchants in Bruges, including Portinari who commissioned the well known Portrait of Tommaso Portinari and Portrait of Maria Portinari. Memling was particularly popular amongst the southern merchant and banker class for seamlessly blending Netherlandish and Italian techniques, styles and motifs.

In 1995, the art historian Michael Rohlmann established that the Virgin and Child with Two Angels in the Uffizi and the two panels of saints at the National Gallery had originally been a Memling triptych. Based on the coat of arms and the cranes on the reverse of the wing panels, Rohlmann identified the original owner as the Florentine churchmen Benedetto Pagagnotti, whose family were close associates to the Medici.

Description

Exterior

The reverse of the wings, visible when the shutters are closed, contain a representation of nine cranes against a late evening dark landscape that is spread across the two panels. Dark trees rise against a darkening sky on the topmost edges, fading to gray, then to pink on the farthest horizon against the tree branches, suggesting either sunset, or sunrise.

A small animal, perhaps a fox, is barely visible in the foliage on the left panel. The left panel has a coat of arms, with red and white chevrons and a pair of compasses on its top corners, positioned above the cranes, against the fading sky.

The light-colored birds have bright red crests that match the coat of arms above. Rohlmann writes that "from out the landscape loom the shadowy grey form of the resting birds, their red crests shining out as isolated points of colour."  Situated directly beneath the coat of arms, the foremost bird holds a stone in its claw, a reference to a classical story that sleeping cranes choose on in the flock to hold a stone; in the event of danger or if the bird falls asleep the stone is dropped, waking the entire flock. The guarding crane is known as grus vigilans, and are emblems of vigilance.

The cranes in a landscape is unusual for 15th-century Netherlandish triptychs; typically the doors, (or reverse panels), were painted in grisaille to represent statues of saints. Ainsworth describes the cranes as "emblematic"; Rohlmann as "fascinating". Art historians are undecided whether the scene is by Memling or members of his workshop. Ainsworth considers it "weak in execution" and the art historian Oliver Hand suggests the flock of birds signify participation by a number of workshop members.

Interior
The Virgin and Child are represented in a space filled with elaborate architectural details of Italian origin. Mary is seated on her throne holding Jesus on her lap, beneath a  canopy of honor decorated in characteristic Memling fashion with swags of red fabric. There are two columns to each side of the throne, two flanking the throne, and the capitals of two others are visible at each edge of the space. The throne is positioned beneath a decorated arch, on which cherubs (putto) are perched holding garlands. Two angels holding musical instruments kneel to side and at front of the throne.

Netherlandish motifs are combined and blended with Italiante all'antica motifs. The central panel rear columns are in a barley twisted design and gilded; their capitals supporting sculptures – Samson killing the lion on the left; Cain slaying Abel on the right. The other columns, those supporting the putti and those seemingly part of Mary's throne are rendered in a dark reddish marble hue, seen in Netherlandish art since Jan van Eyck, but unlike van Eyck, Memling's have gilded bases and capitals, in the Italian fashion.

Spatial and temporal borders separating the earthly and heavenly spheres are often seen in Netherlandish art, usually in the form of frames or arches. A boundary is in achieved Petrus Christus's Nativity with the grisaille archway, with the Holy Family placed firmly behind the arch in the sacred space, beyond the secular and earthly realm. Memling's use of arches tends more towards the decorative; rather than indicating separation of heavenly and earthly spaces, they simply float within a space as a design element. The arch floating above the Virgin and Child exhibits a number of Italianate all'antica motifs. The outer rim consists of half rosettes and the inner rim is decorated on the one side with a grape vine (symbol of the eucharist) and the other side with ivy. Although gilded, resembling polished metal (or perhaps sculpture), the art historian Paula Nuttall writes that the plants "are concomitantly a tour de force of naturalistic observation, with their curling tendrils and delicate roots, as are the two pairs of snail and a lizard beneath them".

The left wing shows St. John the Baptist with his emblem of a Lamb; the right shows St. Lawrence with a book and his instruments of torture. St. John is dressed in a hair shirt and mantle; the saint is almost identical to Memling's St. John in the Donne Triptych and similar to figure in the center panel of the St John Altarpiece. St. Lawrence is dressed in a white alb and a red dalmatic. St. Lawrence is rarely depicted in Netherlandish art or by Memling, suggesting that the buyer requested and approved the specific figure.

The standing saints are enclosed in an architectural frame representing the tracery of Gothic windows; columns with Corinthian capitals are barely visible adjacent to the windows at the back. The architectural details are a juxtaposition of northern and southern motif and influences. Through the windows are landscapes, which were emulated by Italian artists. A tondo by Biagio d'Antonio cites specific portions of the landscapes of the wing panels.

Identification and attribution

In 1995, the art historian Michael Rohlman identified the two narrow panels at the National Gallery and the Uffizi central panel as the separated pieces of triptych by Memling. The identification was based on comparisons between identical dimensions of the London wing panels and the Uffizi central panel; the position of the floor tiles and steps; and similar all'antica architectural motifs across the panels. The positioning of the step and the floor tiles ran across the three panels of original triptych, giving the appearance of a continuous space.

The background landscapes, which were copied by Italian painters, aided in the identification. As early as 1483 the center panel's mill with the man carrying a sack of flour was copied in Filippino Lippi's painting of Saints Paul and Frediano. Fra Bartolomeo's New York Madonna and Child (c. 1497) depicts an almost identical rendition of the mill and elements of the landscape from the St. Lawrence panel.

The elaborate garlands, the number of putti, and the cranes on the exterior view are uncommon motifs in Memling's oeuvre, probably executed according to the client's tastes or specifications. Rohlman traced the distinctive heraldic devices and identified the coat-of-arms as belonging the Florentine Pagagnotti family. The same coat-of-arms is found in another Netherlandish triptych, by the Master of the Legend of St Ursula, which Rohlman identified as commissioned by Paulo Pagagnotti (based on the presence of St Paul on the left wing). Paulo traveled more than once to Bruges as an agent for the Medici, and Rohlmann believes the Memling triptych was commissioned for Paulo's uncle Benedetto, Bishop of Vaison, who resided in a large apartment in Santa Maria Novella, in Florence.

References

Sources

 Ainsworth, Maryan "The Business of Art: Patrons, Clients and Art Markets". Maryann Ainsworth, et al.(eds.)  From van Eyck to Bruegel: Early Netherlandish Painting in the Metropolitan Museum of Art. (1998). Metropolitan Museum, New York. ISBN 0-87099-871-4
 Meiss, Millard. "A New Monumental Painting by Filippino Lippi". The Art Bulletin, vol. 55, no. 4, 1973, pp. 479–93, .
 Birkmeyer, Karl M. "The Arch Motif in Netherlandish Painting of the Fifteenth Century: A Study in Changing Religious Imagery". The Art Bulletin, Vol. 43, No. 2, (Jun., 1961)
 Christiansen, Keith. "The View from Italy". Maryan Ainsworth, et al. (eds.)  From van Eyck to Bruegel: Early Netherlandish Painting in the Metropolitan Museum of Art. (1998). Metropolitan Museum, New York. 
 Chapuis, Julien. "Early Netherlandish Painting: Shifting Perspectives". Maryan Ainsworth, et al. (eds.), From Van Eyck to Bruegel: Early Netherlandish Painting in the Metropolitan Museum of Art.  New York: Metropolitan Museum of Art, (1998). 
 Hand, John Oliver; Metzger, Catherine; Spronk, Ron. Prayers and Portraits: Unfolding the Netherlandish Diptych. New Haven, CT: Yale University Press, 2006. 
 Nuttall, Paula. "Memling's Pagagnotti 'Virgin and Child': Italian Renaissance Sculpture Reimagined. Sculptures Journal, vol 26. Issue 1, 2017, pp 25–36
 Rohlmann, Michael. "Memling's 'Pagagnotti Triptych'". The Burlington Magazine'', vol. 137, no. 1108, 1995, pp. 438–445. . Accessed 16 July 2021.

External links
Catalog entry at the National Gallery

1480s paintings
Paintings by Hans Memling
Triptychs
Paintings of the Madonna and Child
Paintings depicting John the Baptist
Musical instruments in art
Books in art
Sheep in art
Angels in art
Paintings in the collection of the Uffizi
Collections of the National Gallery, London